Hidden Details is the eleventh studio album by the jazz rock band Soft Machine, released in September 2018.

Overview
Hidden Details is the first album released under the Soft Machine moniker since Land of Cockayne in 1981. Musicians from the former-Soft Machine operated under the name "Soft Machine Legacy" from 2004 until dropping the "Legacy" from their name in 2015. This album was recorded by the same line-up that released "Legacy's" 2013 album Burden of Proof. Karl Jenkins, who joined the group in 1972 and became the main composer in 1974, was no longer involved with Soft Machine, having last been active in the group in 1984. His role as keyboardist and sax player was taken over by Theo Travis. Founding member Mike Ratledge received songwriting credits for material written before his departure in 1976.

Track listing

2018 Vinyl version (Tonefloat TF185) 
Side A

Side B
Side C

Side D (Bonus Tracks)

Personnel

 Soft Machine 
 Theo Travis (joined 2006) – tenor and soprano saxophones, flutes, Fender Rhodes piano
 John Etheridge (joined 1975) – electric and acoustic guitars
 Roy Babbington (joined 1973) – bass
 John Marshall (joined 1972) – drums, percussion

 Guest musicians 
 Nick Utteridge – wind chimes on "Breathe"

References

External links
 Soft Machine - Hidden Details (2018) user reviews, credits & releases at AllMusic
 Soft Machine - Hidden Details (2018) album releases & credits at Discogs
 Soft Machine - Hidden Details (2018) album credits & user reviews at ProgArchives.com
 Soft Machine - Hidden Details (2018) album to be listened on Spotify
 Soft Machine - Hidden Details (2018) album to be listened on YouTube

Soft Machine albums
2018 albums